Joaquín Reyes Cano (born 16 August 1974) is a Spanish actor, draftsman and comedian.

Career
He managed the humorist sitcom Museo Coconut at Neox, a TDT channel of Antena 3, playing the role of Onofre. He previously worked on the Televisión Española program Muchachada Nui, La Hora Chanante in La 2, Fibrilando and Camera Café (Telecinco); and collaborates for the radio program No Somos Nadie (M80).

Reyes studied Fine Arts at the University of Castile-La Mancha and he has worked as an illustrator for publications like "El Barco de Vapor" or Zumo de lluvia, by Teresa Broseta.

In 2002, he joined Ernesto Sevilla, Pablo Chiapella and Raúl Cimas, the so-called "Trío de Albacete" ("Albacete's Trio", they were all from that province) for the Paramount Comedy program La Hora Chanante.

In 2017 Reyes enjoyed a Netflix special, Joaquín Reyes Una y No Mas, which served to introduce him to the American public. He presents the TV show Cero en Historia with Silvia Abril, Raúl Cimas, Sara Escudero and J.J. Vaquero as panelists.

He returned with Ernesto Sevilla in the TV series Capítulo 0, which was released on 11 September 2018.

Filmography 
Ghost Graduation (2012)
Spanish Movie, (2009)
Animal Crisis, (2006)
La Gran Revelación, (2004)

Television 
 Cero en Historia (2017-), #0
Muchachada Nui (2007-), La 2
Camera Café (2005-), Richard, Telecinco
La Hora Chanante (2002–2006), Paramount Comedy
A Pelo (2006–2007), La Sexta
Nuevos Cómicos (2001), Paramount Comedy
¡Salvemos Eurovisión! (2008), La 1
Planeta Finito en Escocia (2007), La Sexta
Lo + Plus (2004–2005), Roberto Picazo, Canal+
Smonka! (2005), Onofre, Paramount Comedy
Noche sin tregua (2004–2006), Roberto Picazo, Paramount Comedy
Miradas 2 (2007), TVE
Cámara Abierta 2.0 (2007), TVE
Informe Semanal (2007), TVE
Silenci? (2006), TV3

Radio 
No somos nadie, M80 Radio

Drawings 
 Colección El Barco de Vapor
El club de los coleccionistas de noticias
 Zumo de lluvia de Teresa Broseta
 Colección Grupo SM
Latín. Diccionario didáctico
Valencià 3º E.P. Nou Projecte Terra.
Editorial Cruïlla
Ortografía castellana elemental
El País
Summer supplements 2007–2008.

References

External links 

  Reportaje 50 programas
 Trío de Albacete
 Joaquín Reyes Chanante
 Joaquín Reyes Club de Fans {28-02-06/28-02-09}

1974 births
Living people
Spanish comedians
Spanish male television actors
Spanish illustrators
People from Albacete
Spanish stand-up comedians
21st-century Spanish male actors
Male actors from Castilla–La Mancha